John Vaughan (c. 1752–1804) was a Welsh landowner and politician who sat in the House of Commons from 1779 to 1784.

Vaughan was the eldest son of Richard Vaughan of Golden Grove, Carmarthenshire, and his first wife Margaret Phillips, daughter of Charles Phillips of Llanelly. He was admitted at Lincoln's Inn in 1771. He undertook a Grand Tour in the company of John Campbell, 1st Baron Cawdor.

Vaughan was returned unopposed as Member of Parliament for Carmarthenshire at a by-election on 2 September 1779 and at the 1780 general election. He was appointed Lord Lieutenant of Carmarthenshire in 1780. He succeeded his father to his extensive estates in 1781 and married Elizabeth Letitia Maude, daughter of Sir Cornwallis Maude, 3rd Baronet on 16 June 1781. He did not stand in 1784. He does not appear to have spoken in the Parliament.

Vaughan died on 19 January 1804 without legitimate issue and left his estate to his friend Lord Cawdor. The Gentleman's Magazine (1804, p. 687) wrote “‘He has left several natural children in the neighbourhood without the smallest provision for either of them.”

References

1750s births
1804 deaths
People from Carmarthenshire
Members of Lincoln's Inn
Members of the Parliament of Great Britain for Welsh constituencies
British MPs 1774–1780
British MPs 1780–1784
Lord-Lieutenants of Carmarthenshire